Gao Tingyu  (born 15 December 1997) is a Chinese speed skater who is the Olympic record holder and champion in the Men's 500m event. He had served as one of the flag bearers for Team China at both the 2022 Beijing Winter Olympic's opening ceremony, and its closing ceremony.

Career
Gao made his Olympic debut at the 2018 PyeongChang Olympics, winning a bronze medal in the Men's 500m speed skating event. In doing so, Gao had become the first male speed skater from China to win a medal in Olympic speed skating.

Gao competed in the 500m event at the 2022 Beijing Winter Olympics, where he won a gold and also set the new Olympic record with a time of 34.32 seconds, making him the first Chinese man to win a gold medal in Olympic speedskating.

References

External links

1997 births
Living people
Chinese male speed skaters
Olympic speed skaters of China
Speed skaters at the 2018 Winter Olympics
Speed skaters at the 2022 Winter Olympics
Medalists at the 2018 Winter Olympics
Medalists at the 2022 Winter Olympics
Olympic medalists in speed skating
Olympic gold medalists for China
Olympic bronze medalists for China
Speed skaters at the 2017 Asian Winter Games
Medalists at the 2017 Asian Winter Games
Asian Games medalists in speed skating
Asian Games gold medalists for China
People from Yichun, Heilongjiang
World Single Distances Speed Skating Championships medalists
21st-century Chinese people